First Time Out is an American sitcom television series that aired on The WB. Originally holding the working title Girlfriends and described as a "Latino Living Single". The series premiered on September 10, 1995, and last aired an original episode on December 17, 1995, after which time it was put on hiatus by The WB, leaving four episodes unaired.

Plot
The sitcom followed energetic, ambitious, chubby Jackie (Jackie Guerra), a Yale University graduate who now has a trendy hair salon in Los Angeles, California, attends law-school classes at night, and longs to find a man. She shares an apartment with her friends Dominique (Leah Remini), a cynical assistant at Ventura Records, and Susan (Mia Cottet), who's about to get her psychotherapist license and is neurotic herself. She's good friends with her co-workers at the salon, Rosa (Tracy Vilar) and Freddy (Harry Van Gorkum), an obnoxious, womanizing English hairstylist. Rounding out the cast are Madeline (Roxanne Beckford), a yuppie executive who lives across the hall, and Nathan (Craig Anton), Jackie's klutzy, sex-obsessed childhood friend.

The WB network called Jackie, "the first Latina to star in her own series".

Cast
 Jackie Guerra – Jackie
 Leah Remini – Dominique Constellano
 Tracy Vilar – Rosa
 Roxanne Beckford – Madeline
 Mia Cottet – Susan
 Craig Anton – Nathan
 Harry Van Gorkum – Freddy

Episodes
Only 12 episodes of First Time Out aired on The WB. 4 episodes were still unaired.

References

External links
 
 

1990s American sitcoms
1995 American television series debuts
1995 American television series endings
The WB original programming
Television shows set in Los Angeles
Television series by Sony Pictures Television
English-language television shows
Latino sitcoms